Parliamentary elections were held in Iran on 15 April 1984, with a second round on 17 May. The majority of seats were won by independents, whilst the Islamic Republican Party was the only party to win seats. Voter turnout was 65.1% in the first round.

The Freedom Movement of Iran declared that it would boycott the elections after its headquarters was attacked and the authorities refused to permit the party to hold two seminars.

Background
The election was held under conditions of severe sanctions on politic and economical sector as well as war with Iraq's Baathist government (Iran-Iraq War). This election was also first time since 1979 revolution which only one political party were allowed to participated (as other political parties were banned & even dissolved before this election).

Conduct
The election was held under conditions of war with Iraq's Baathist government (Iran-Iraq War), caused many cities in border with Iraq were severely destroyed (or could not hold direct election). Therefore. this election was conducted with two ways :
 Direct national election (for areas that were not heavily affected by war and also for religious minorities seats)
 Indirect national election (for areas that were heavily affected by war -mainly in border with Iraq-)

Out of 193 constituencies, 187 (including 5 electoral districts for religious minorities) hold direct election while the six others hold indirect elections. These six were :
 Mehran (Ilam & Mehran constituency) - Ilam Province
 Dehloran (Dehloran & Darreh Shahr constituency) - Ilam Province
 Abadeh (Abadeh constituency)  - Fars Province
 Susangerd (Dasht-e-Azadegan constituency)  - Khuzestan Province
 Khorramshahr (Khorramshahr constituency)  - Khuzestan Province
 Qasr-e-Shirin (Qasr-e-Shirin & Sarpol-e-Zahab constituency)  - Kermanshah Province

Results
130 seats were elected in second round.

Akbar Hashemi Rafsanjani remained in his position as Speaker of Majlis

By-elections
For second period of Majlis, five by-elections were held. It was held on :
 8 August 1984
 14 September 1984
 26 October 1984
 1 August 1986
 23 August 1986

See also
List of MPs elected in the 1984 Iranian legislative election

References

1984 elections in Iran
Islamic Consultative Assembly elections
One-party elections
Iran